Te Aroha is a rural town in the Waikato region of New Zealand with a population of 3,906 people in the 2013 census, an increase of 138 people since 2006. It sits at the foot of  Mount Te Aroha, the highest point in the Kaimai Range.

History 
The name Te Aroha derives from the Māori name of Mount Te Aroha. In one version, Rāhiri, the eponymous ancestor of Ngāti Rāhiri Tumutumu, climbed the mountain and saw his homeland in the distance and felt a sense of love for it. The town is properly named ;  meaning 'inland', so the town is named "love flowing inland". In some Tainui traditions, Rakataura, a tohunga of the Tainui waka, was one of the first people to leave the waka, settling at Rarotonga / Mount Smart. After a period of time, Rakataura decided to leave Tāmaki Makaurau and travel south, however during the journey his wife Kahukeke died. Eventually Rakataura settled at Te Aroha, naming the area after the love he felt for Kahukeke.

The European settlement was established in the late 1870s. The population grew quickly during the 1880s as a result of a gold rush. A spa was founded in 1883 but popularity had declined by the 1930s.

Te Aroha Borough Council took over from the 1880 Town Board on 2 May 1898. Herriesville became part of Te Aroha Borough Council. The 1938 Council Chambers is now a Category 2 listed building. Matamata-Piako District Council took over under the 1989 local government reforms.

Created in 1888, Te Aroha and Lemon was New Zealand's first local fizzy drink. It was produced up until the 1960s.

On 17 February 1985 Te Aroha experienced a severe flash flood that washed boulders, mud, and trees through the town. Most shops and more than 50 homes were damaged, resulting in the death of three people.

Bridges 

Coulter Bridge, over the Waihou River, on Kenrick St (SH26) was rebuilt in 1910 and the present bridge was built alongside it in 1928. It was rebuilt in 1912, replacing an 1895 swing bridge. It is now a footbridge, but will not be replaced.

Railway stations 

The Thames Branch reached Te Aroha in 1885 and the station opened on 1 March 1886, when it had a partly built 4th class station (completed in June 1886 by W Cameron for about £2,750, with some buildings probably also moved from Eureka to Te Aroha), platform, cart approach,  x  goods shed (extended in 1942), loading bank, engine shed, stationmaster's house, urinals and a passing loop for 48 wagons. Te Aroha remained a terminus until the line to Paeroa opened on 20 December 1895. Cattle yards were added later in 1886, a coffee stall in 1896 and more improvements in 1897. The station was described in 1902 as, "of wood, and include a ladies' waiting room, a public waiting room, a vestibule, stationmaster's office, ticket office, and parcels office. There is a long asphalted platform."

The area west of the Waihou was named Herriesville from 1914, when a private railway siding was opened on 24 January 1914 to serve the A&P ground. William Herries had been a local landowner. Seven railway cottages were built in 1924. Both stations closed to passengers on 11 September 1967 and to freight on 11 July 1986, though Herriesville was only open for racecourse traffic.

Demographics

Te Aroha had a population of 4,554 at the 2018 New Zealand census, an increase of 549 people (13.7%) since the 2013 census, and an increase of 744 people (19.5%) since the 2006 census. There were 1,776 households, comprising 2,214 males and 2,337 females, giving a sex ratio of 0.95 males per female, with 849 people (18.6%) aged under 15 years, 639 (14.0%) aged 15 to 29, 1,839 (40.4%) aged 30 to 64, and 1,221 (26.8%) aged 65 or older.

Ethnicities were 84.8% European/Pākehā, 17.7% Māori, 3.9% Pacific peoples, 6.4% Asian, and 2.0% other ethnicities. People may identify with more than one ethnicity.

The percentage of people born overseas was 17.1, compared with 27.1% nationally.

Although some people chose not to answer the census's question about religious affiliation, 48.6% had no religion, 37.2% were Christian, 0.7% had Māori religious beliefs, 0.1% were Hindu, 0.7% were Muslim, 2.0% were Buddhist and 1.7% had other religions.

Of those at least 15 years old, 384 (10.4%) people had a bachelor's or higher degree, and 1,095 (29.6%) people had no formal qualifications. 450 people (12.1%) earned over $70,000 compared to 17.2% nationally. The employment status of those at least 15 was that 1,506 (40.6%) people were employed full-time, 498 (13.4%) were part-time, and 126 (3.4%) were unemployed.

Geography 

The Waihou River runs through Te Aroha. Close by to the east is the base of the Kaimai Range, and the town is overlooked by the 952-metre Mount Te Aroha. To the north of the town is the low-lying, swampy land of the Hauraki Plains.

Hot springs
Thermal and mineral springs are both found close to the centre of the town. The springs have been used by the Māori for many years before becoming popular in the 1870s with European settlers. The New Zealand Herald writes that the site was gifted to New Zealand by chief Mokena Hou in the 1880s. The hot spring water emerges from the source at a range of 75 °C /167 °F to 85 °C / 185 °F, and is cooled before reaching the soaking pools. Te Aroha has a hot soda-water geyser, which is the only one of its kind in the Southern Hemisphere.

Economy 
Te Aroha is at the centre of a dairy farming community and much of its economic activity is in serving that community. Tourism is increasing in Te Aroha. The mineral baths are a very popular spot for tourists and locals alike.

Historically mining played a role in the area, and has left some legacies – not all of them positive, such as toxic residues leaking from the abandoned Tui mine tailings dam. Miners' cottages are in evidence.

Attractions 
Te Aroha is the location of the Mokena Hou Geyser, the only natural soda water geyser in the world. The geyser complex, the most intact Edwardian spa in New Zealand, is located in the Te Aroha Domain.

The first sections of the Hauraki Rail Trail opened in 2012, connecting the town to Paeroa, Waihi, Matamata and Thames.

Events 

 Waihou and Te Aroha Cobras play an annual rugby match for the Dr Dunn memorial trophy. This is one of the biggest days on the calendar of Te Aroha.
 A Day in the Domain was started in Te Aroha in 1977 by the Arts Council and continues to be a fun, affordable day out. The day attracts artists and performers from far and wide with a variety of stalls and foodies on display. Entertainment is free with competitions and games all day.
 The King and Queen of the Mountain and Bald Spur Derby have been annual events in Te Aroha since the 1950s. Held the weekend before Christmas, the challenge is to be the first man or woman up Mt Te Aroha and back down again. This has been achieved in under one hour. The Bald Spur Derby offers competitors a shorter but still challenging course.
 Te Aroha AP & H Show has been running since the 1890s. Boasting one of the most extensive home industries sections, it has full agricultural and equestrian sections and the usual country fair activities such as the gumboot throwing competition and cattle dogs.

 Te Aroha Cruise In (car event) started 2008.

Education

All these schools are co-educational. Rolls are as of

Notable people
 Olympic Gold Medalist Peter Snell
 All Blacks Don Clarke, Kevin 'Herb' Schuler, Carl Hoeft, Keith Robinson and Kevin O'Neill
 Ian S. Ardern of the First Quorum of the Seventy of the Church of Jesus Christ of Latter-day Saints was born in the town
 Robert Coulter, Mayor of Te Aroha and Labour MP
 David Cunliffe, former leader of the New Zealand Labour Party, was born in Te Aroha.
 Stuart Farquhar, Olympic javelin thrower
 Jack Body, New Zealand composer
 Don Beard, New Zealand cricketer and principal of Te Aroha College from 1961 to 1982
 Todd Muller, Member of Parliament for Bay of Plenty, was born in Te Aroha.

Fauna and flora
In 2020 a report was produced on the moths of Mount Te Aroha outlining important species that inhabit the area.

References

External links 

 Te Aroha i-SITE Visitor Centre
 Te Aroha Museum Website
 Te Aroha section of the MPDC website
 Te Aroha College

Photos -

 Main street 1909
 Railway station - 1899, 1903, 1905, 1905, 1908 (new station) 1910
 Railway swing bridge 1898

 
Populated places in Waikato
Spa towns in New Zealand
Hot springs of New Zealand
Geysers of New Zealand
Landforms of Waikato
Matamata-Piako District